Calvin John Williams Jr. (born March 3, 1967) is a former American football player who played for seven seasons in the National Football League (NFL).

Career
Williams was drafted by the Philadelphia Eagles in the fifth round of the 1990 NFL Draft. He was the third wide receiver the Eagles chose in the draft, behind Mike Bellamy and Fred Barnett. As a rookie in 1990, Williams earned the starting wide receiver spot alongside Mike Quick in training camp, which was previously held by Cris Carter. He went on to break the team's rookie touchdown reception record set by Bobby Walston in 1951 with nine. He made 37 catches for 602 yards and was named to Football News' All-Rookie Team.

Williams led the team in touchdown receptions in 1990 and 1992, and in 1993 he led the team with 10 touchdown catches, a career-high. In 1993, he caught 60 passes for 725 yards. In a game against the Washington Redskins on September 19, Williams caught eight passes for 181 yards and three touchdowns, including the winning score. He earned the NFC Offensive Player of the Week for his performance. In 1995 he led the team with 63 receptions, a career-high. In 1996 he also played with the Baltimore Ravens.

After football
Williams was the athletic director and a physical education teacher at the Bluford Drew Jemison S.T.E.M. Academy. He became the assistant athletics director for Purdue University in 2011. Williams resides in West Lafayette, IN with his wife and their three children Jonah, Sydney and Rachel.

References

1967 births
Living people
Players of American football from Baltimore
American football wide receivers
Purdue Boilermakers football players
Philadelphia Eagles players
Baltimore Ravens players